San Joaquin Valley National Cemetery is a United States National Cemetery located at 32053 West McCabe Road, Santa Nella, in Merced County, California. The number of interments through fiscal year 2008 is 30,054.

History 
In 1989, the Romero Ranch Company donated land to the Department of Veterans Affairs for the creation of a National Cemetery. The first phase developed 105 acres (42 ha) of the land, and was completed in May 1992, giving enough space for the interment of over 20,000 remains.

There is a small military museum on site, which has exhibits of uniforms, medals, and other memorabilia.

Noteworthy monuments 
 The California Korean War Veterans Memorial, erected in 1998. It consists of 16 five-foot-tall granite monoliths arranged in a circle. Engraved on each monolith is the name of the 2,495 veterans from California who died during the Korean War.
 The 11th Airborne Memorial, a granite and bronze monument dedicated in 2002 in honor of all airborne forces.

Notable interments 
 Seaman William Troy (1848–1907) – Medal of Honor recipient for action aboard the USS Colorado while assaulting Korean forts in 1871.
 Mac Foster (1942–2010) – Sergeant, United States Marine Corps, and professional boxer

References

External links 
 Cem.va.gov:  Official San Joaquin Valley National Cemetery website
 Cem.va.gov: National Cemetery Administration website
 

Cemeteries in California
United States national cemeteries
Protected areas of Merced County, California
History of the San Joaquin Valley
United States in the Korean War
1990 establishments in California
Cultural infrastructure completed in 1990
Tourist attractions in Merced County, California